The Missouri Valley Conference Hall of Fame was established in 1997 in celebration of the league's 90th anniversary. It was established to honor on an annual basis the great players, coaches and administrators in Missouri Valley Conference history. The MVC Hall of Fame is housed in the Scottrade Center in St. Louis.

Selection criteria
The individual must have competed as a Missouri Valley Conference student-athlete, coached and/or served in an administrative capacity during the time his/her institution was or currently is a member of the Missouri Valley Conference.
Individuals must have completed their athletic eligibility, left the coaching ranks or been out of the Conference for at least five years.
Individuals do not have to be Missouri Valley Conference graduates; they need only have attended or worked at an MVC institution.

Members

 * Institutional Great
 * * Lifetime Achievement
 * * * Paul Morrison Award

References

Hall of Fame
Halls of fame in Missouri
College sports halls of fame in the United States